Science Bulletin is a multidisciplinary scientific journal co-sponsored by the Chinese Academy of Sciences and the National Natural Science Foundation of China. It is published by Elsevier on behalf of Science China Magazine Press and focuses on research in various fields of the natural sciences. 

Since 2011, its articles have been published open access under the Creative Commons by Attribution license, but since 2014, only some of its articles may be published under the Creative Commons by Attribution license.

According to the Journal Citation Reports, the journal has a 2020 impact factor of 11.78.

References

External links 

 

English-language journals
Multidisciplinary scientific journals
Chinese Academy of Sciences
Creative Commons Attribution-licensed journals
Springer Science+Business Media academic journals
Biweekly journals
Publications established in 1956